Zagros Airlines is an Iranian airline headquartered in Tehran and based at Mehrabad International Airport.

History

Zagros Airlines was founded in 2005 in Abadan, Iran. The airline uses Mehrabad International Airport and Mashhad International Airport as its operating bases. In 2007, Zagros Airlines started its first international route from Tehran to the Syrian capital of Damascus.

In September 2013, the airline took delivery of an Airbus A320-200. In January 2016, Zagros Airlines acquired Iran's first A319. On March 14, 2017, the airline acquired its first A321-200 through wet lease from Khors Aircompany.

Destinations

Fleet
As of August 2019, the Zagros Airlines fleet consisted of the following aircraft:

Fleet development
In June 2017, it was announced that the airline had signed an MOU with Airbus for an order of 20 A320neo and 8 A330neo aircraft.

Accidents and incidents
 On 28 January 2016, Zagros Airlines Flight 4010 was landing at Mashhad International Airport's Runway 31R when the McDonnell Douglas MD-83, registration EP-ZAB, skidded off the runway, due to weather conditions. The aircraft was badly damaged but there were no injuries.

The First Iranian Female Pilot
In July 2019, Zagros Airlines became the first Iranian Airliner to have a female Pilot, Neshat Jahandari became the first female pilot in the country ever since the Iranian Revolution. Mrs. Jahandari is known as a national treasure due to her influence in the nations female leadership. Currently, she is also the youngest Female Pilot in the country.

The Same year in October 2019, exactly 3 month after Jahandari Introduction to Zagros Airlines, She was part of the first all Female Flight in Iran, as well as the Middle East Region.
This has majorly impacted Zagros Airlines reputation in Female leadership.

See also
 List of airlines of Iran

References

External links 

 

Airlines of Iran
Airlines established in 2005
Iranian brands
Iranian companies established in 2005